Theresa Marie Koehler is an American microbiologist who is the Herbert L. and Margaret W. DuPont Distinguished Professor in Biomedical Sciences and Chair of the Department of Microbiology and Molecular Genetics at McGovern Medical School. She is known for her extensive research on anthrax and was elected Fellow of the American Association for the Advancement of Science in 2021.

Early life and education 
Koehler was an undergraduate student in biology at Virginia Tech. She moved to the University of Massachusetts Amherst for graduate studies, where she focused on microbiology. She remained there for her doctoral research. Koehler was a postdoctoral fellow at Harvard Medical School.

Research and career 
In 1991, Koehler joined the faculty at McGovern Medical School. Her research considers host-pathogen interactions, with a particular focus on the Bacillus cereus group species. As an internationally-recognized expert on anthrax, her laboratory was one of the few institutions licensed by the Centers for Disease Control and Prevention to investigate the bacterium in the early 2000s.

Koehler served on the editorial board of the Journal of Bacteriology. She currently serves as Associate Editor of PLOS Pathogens. She is Chair of the National Institutes of Health Review Group on Bacterial Pathogenesis.

Awards and honors 
 2008 Elected Fellow of the American Academy of Microbiology
 2009 Paul E. Darlington Award
 2021 Elected Fellow of the American Association for the Advancement of Science

Selected publications

References 

Living people
Year of birth missing (living people)
Place of birth missing (living people)
21st-century American biologists
American microbiologists
21st-century American women scientists
Women microbiologists
Fellows of the American Association for the Advancement of Science
University of Texas Health Science Center at Houston faculty
Virginia Tech alumni
University of Massachusetts Amherst alumni
Fellows of the American Academy of Microbiology